Events from the year 1924 in Romania. The year saw the first time that the country competed as a team in the Summer Olympic Games, and, although the  country won no medals, Romania went on to enter every subsequent game apart from 1932 Summer Olympics.

Incumbents
 King: Ferdinand.
 Prime Minister: Ion I. C. Brătianu.

Events
 1 January – The Aeronautica Regală Română (ARR), or Romanian Royal Aeronautics, is founded.
 29 March – Rioters in Bucharest target Jews in anti-semitic attacks that continued through the night into the next morning.  
 3 April – The Italian government issues Romania with an ultimatum requiring a payment of 80 million Italian lira for outstanding debts. Several Regia Marina warships are stationed off the port of Constanța to back up the demand.
 10 April – King Ferdinand and Queen Marie arrive in Paris on a royal visit. Though officially only a friendly visit, it was believed that Romania was seeking an alliance with France as a counter to unfriendly relations with Italy, Russia and Spain.
 11 April – The Romanian government bans the Romanian Communist Party.
 16 April – Romania announces it has settled its debts with Italy.
 27 May – The Romania national football team compete for the first time in the 1924 Summer Olympics. They are defeated 6–0 by the Netherlands.
 29 May – An ammunition depot explodes in Cotroceni, causing $3 million damage to the Royal Palace and other buildings.
 5 July – Romania enters the Summer Olympics for the first time as a team. Although the team does not receive any medals, the country goes on to compete in every game apart from the 1932 games .
 10 August – Romania is one of the nine countries represented at the first First International Silent Games held in Paris.
 12 October – The declaration of the Moldavian Autonomous Soviet Socialist Republic heightens tensions between Moldovans and Romanians.
 25 November – The Bucharest government vote one million lei to construct a crematorium.
 23 December – Nicolae Bretan's opera Golem is first performed at the Hungarian Theater in Cluj.

Births
 2 January – Victor Mercea, nuclear physicist (died 1987).
 15 February – Kemal Karpat, historian and professor at the University of Wisconsin–Madison (died 2019).
 20 February – Eugen Barbu, novelist, short story writer, and journalist (died 1993).
 8 March – Alma Redlinger, painter and illustrator (died 2017).
 15 June – Hédi Szmuk, Swedish-Romanian author and psychologist, survivor of Nazi concentration camps (died 2022).
 15 August – Selma Meerbaum-Eisinger, poet (died 1942).
 26 August –  Elena Moldovan Popoviciu, mathematician (died 2009).
 8 September – Solange d'Herbez de la Tour, architect.
 5 October – Marianne Fillenz, neuroscientist (died 2012).
 27 November  – Renée Annie Cassian-Mătăsaru, pen name Nina Cassian, children's author, journalist, poet, translator and film critic (died 2014).
 17 December – Alexander Bickel, legal scholar and expert on the United States Constitution (died 1974).

Deaths
 15 April – Eduard Caudella, composer (born 1841).
 19 October – Iancu Flondor, politician who advocated the Union of Bukovina with Romania (born 1865).
 22 October – Wilhelm Knechtel, botanist and numismatist (born 1837).

References

Years of the 20th century in Romania
1920s in Romania
 
Romania
Romania